The Canadian territory of Nunavut was formed in April 1999, by the splitting of the Northwest Territories. 

At the time of division, the governments of both territories agreed to Nunavut continuing to use the NWT's polar bear-shaped licence plates, which had been in use since 1970. Although the design of the plates was shared, the government of the NWT held the copyright. Nunavut's version of the plate differed from the NWT's in the name of the jurisdiction at the bottom and the presence of an 'N' suffix in the serial.

In 2010, the government of the NWT decided to update its version of the polar bear-shaped plate. In turn, the government of Nunavut opted to go with a new plate design. On 3 August 2011, Nunavut announced that a contest would be held to create the new plates.

The contest was entered by 123 people, who between them submitted 200 designs. On 6 March 2012, Iqaluit resident Ron Froese was named the winner. His design consisted of a night scene featuring a polar bear, an inuksuk, three sets of northern lights to represent the three regions of Nunavut (Kitikmeot, Kivalliq and Qikiqtaaluk), and 25 stars to represent the communities of the territory. This design was first made available to motorists in July 2012.

Passenger baseplates 1999 to present

Non-passenger plates

References

External links
Nunavut licence plates, 1999–present

Nunavut
Transport in Nunavut